Yazor is a small village and civil parish in the English county of Herefordshire. It was formerly served by Moorhampton railway station located in the parish. The population of the parish at the 2011 Census was 122.

History
St Mary the Virgin's Church, Yazor is a redundant Anglican church, designated by English Heritage as a Grade II listed building, and is under the care of the Churches Conservation Trust. The Victorian building was constructed in 1843 by George Moore, and the Price family monuments were transferred to it. The three bay arcade was of 15th century origin, and the west tower from a century before. There was a south transept of one bay's width on the west aisle. To the south lie the ruins of Old Yazor church.

References

External links

GENUKI(tm) page
Photos of Yazor and surrounding area on geograph

Villages in Herefordshire
Civil parishes in Herefordshire